Selina westermanni is a species of beetle in the family Carabidae, the only species in the genus Selina.

References

Lebiinae